Kristineberg may refer to:

Kristineberg, Lycksele, a village in Lycksele Municipality, Sweden
Kristineberg, Malmö, a village in Malmö Municipality, Sweden
Kristineberg, Oskarshamn, a city district in Oskarshamn, Sweden
Kristineberg, Stockholm, a city district in Stockholm, Sweden